The Merom HaGalil Regional Council (Mo'atza Azorit Merom HaGalil) is a regional council in the northern Galilee of northern Israel. The regional council was established in 1950. The head of the council is Shlomo Levi.

List of settlements
This regional council provides various municipal services for various villages within its territory including moshavim, a kibbutz, and other types of settlements:

Community settlements
Amuka
Bar Yochai
Birya
Inbar
Kalanit
Kfar Hananya
Livnim
Or HaGanuz

Kibbutzim
Parod

Moshavim
Alma
Amirim
Avivim
Dovev
Dalton
Hazon
Kerem Ben Zimra
Kfar Hoshen
Kfar Shamai
Meron
Safsufa
Shefer
Shezor
Tefahot

Minority villages
Ein el-Asad (Druze)
Rehaniya (Circassian)

Unrecognised
Kadita

External links
Official website 

 
Regional councils in Northern District (Israel)